José Refugio "Cuco" Sánchez Saldaña (3 May 1921 – 5 October 2000) was a Mexican singer, songwriter, guitarist, and actor.

Sánchez was one of Mexico's most popular singers and recorded most of his singles and studio albums for Columbia Records. He is also one of Mexico's most famous and prolific songwriters. His songs include "Anillo de compromiso", "Anoche estuve llorando", "Por qué peca esa mujer", "Fallaste, corazón", "La cama de piedra", "Siempre hace frío", "Arrieros somos", "No soy monedita de oro", "Del cielo cayó una rosa", "Cariño santo", "Nuestro gran amor", "Grítenme, piedras del campo", and "¡Qué manera de perder!".

He also acted in films and television series.

Life and career
Sánchez was born in Altamira, a port city on the Gulf of Mexico, to José Refugio Sánchez and Felipa Saldaña Cabello. He began writing verses in his early years and later learned how to play the guitar. In 1937, at age 15, he wrote his first hit song, "Mi chata", which was recorded by the duet Las Serranitas. In the same year he began singing on the XEW radio station, where he eventually had his own program. Because of his young age and overnight success as a songwriter, he came to be known as El Benjamín de los Compositores (literally "The Benjamin of Songwriters", or "The Youngest of Songwriters").

Some of his early songs were "¡Qué rechulo es querer!", "Óigame, compadre", and "Yo también soy mexicano".

His songs were performed, recorded, and made famous by himself and various recording artists, such as Pedro Infante, Miguel Aceves Mejía, La Panchita, Amalia Mendoza, Verónica Loyo, Flor Silvestre, Antonio Aguilar, Dora María, Lucha Villa, Vikki Carr, Linda Ronstadt, Selena, and Chavela Vargas.

Sánchez was married to María Teresa de la Vega. He died of kidney failure on 5 October 2000 in Mexico City.

Selected filmography
 Engagement Ring (1951)
 Pablo and Carolina (1957)
 It Happened in Mexico (1958)
 The Soldiers of Pancho Villa (1959)

See also
Ranchera

References

External links
 

1921 births
2000 deaths
20th-century Mexican male actors
Male actors from Tamaulipas
Mexican male film actors
Mexican male television actors
Mexican male actors
Male songwriters
Mexican songwriters
People from Tamaulipas
Singers from Tamaulipas
20th-century Mexican male singers